The Romania national football team represents the nation of Romania in international association football. It is fielded by the Romanian Football Federation (FRF) and competes as a member of Union of European Football Associations (UEFA), which encompasses the countries of Europe. The team played its first official international match on 8 June 1922 against Yugoslavia. Since its first competitive match, 802 players have made at least one international appearance for the team. Of them, 89 have served as captain of the national team. This list contains football players who have served as captain of the Romania national team and is listed according to their number of matches captained.

Captains 

Appearances and matches captained are composed of FIFA World Cup, UEFA European Football Championship, and each competition's required qualification matches, as well as numerous international friendly tournaments and matches. Players are initially listed by number of matches captained. If there's an equal number of matches captained, then the player who captained the national team first is listed first. Statistics correct as of 8 October 2016.

References 

Captains
Romania
Association football player non-biographical articles